Paracortinidae is a family of millipedes in the order Callipodida. It is currently made up of two genera and about 12 species; however, genetic studies are needed to properly determine the structure of the family. The members of the family are found across Vietnam and southern China.

Genera 
There are currently two genera in Paracortinidae:

 Angulifemur 
 Paracortina

References 

Callipodida
Millipede families